Metopios is a genus of moth in the family Gelechiidae. It contains the species Metopios tozeurellum, which is found in North Africa.

References

Gelechiidae